Campodea emeryi is a species of two-pronged bristletail in the family Campodeidae.

Subspecies
These three subspecies belong to the species Campodea emeryi:
 Campodea emeryi algira Conde, 1948 g
 Campodea emeryi emeryi Silvestri, 1912 g
 Campodea emeryi spelaea Conde, 1978 g
Data sources: i = ITIS, c = Catalogue of Life, g = GBIF, b = Bugguide.net

References

Further reading

 
 
 
 
 
 
 
 

Diplura
Animals described in 1912